The 1931 Wyoming Cowboys football team was an American football team that represented the University of Wyoming as a member of the Rocky Mountain Conference (RMC) during the 1931 college football season.  In their second season under head coach John Rhodes, the Cowboys compiled a 6–4 record (3–2 against RMC opponents), tied for fourth place in the conference, and outscored opponents by a total of 170 to 75.

The 1931 team had the only winning record in Wyoming program history between 1925 and 1949.

On October 24, 1931, Wyoming's athletic ground was dedicated as Corbett Field in honor of the school's longtime coach and athletic director, John Corbett.

At the end of the season, two Wyoming players received honors on the Associated Press All-Rocky Mountain Conference football team. Halfback Carl Dir received second-team honors, and tackle Clarence Smith received third-team honors.

Schedule

References

Wyoming
Wyoming Cowboys football seasons
Wyoming Cowboys football